Riyuni Lekhmar is a remote village located in Garur Tehsil of Bageshwar District in Uttarakhand State of India. It is part of the Bageshwar Vidhan Sabha and Almora Lok Sabha constituency. It is situated at 1300m above mean sea level and is surrounded by Pine forests from three sides and one rivulet flowing from NE to SW direction towards southern side of village periphery. The village Panchayat is combination of three four sub villages to include Riyuni, Lekhmar, Paniyagaad and Bagotiya.

Demographically the village have fairly healthy composition of all Castes of Hindu Dharma and maintains population density of 46 families, 195 citizens. The village has a sex ratio of 1216 as per census 2011. As on year 2021 the population of village has been increased to 670 citizens with similar sex ratio as was in Census 2011.

Agricultural land of the village is utilised to produce cereal crops of Rabi & Kharif variety. New budding farmers are also trying their hands on Fruit crops also. The village faces difficulty for direct to home supply of piped drinking water and is still dependent on 05-06 natural water spring. There is no streamlined irrigation system available and 60% of farming is still dependent on rain water.

The village is connected by Black top metalled road sanctioned by govt, but with no bridge existing leaving it unusable during heavy rains. A cemented foot track is also available and is used by villagers for commuting during rainy season. The village is 9 km from town of Garud being the nearest communication centre. The village is streamed with mobile networks of Airtel, Jio, Vi & BSNL. The village also has a three phase electricity supply.

The village has two Primary schools and one Aanganwaadi centre. The village has no medical setup for emergencies and is dependent on Community Health Centre, Baijnath at a distance of 07 km from the village. The village has elected Shri Kailash Ram Aagri as their Village Pradhan. Last open meeting of the Gram Panchayat was held on 12 Nov 2022.

References

Villages in Bageshwar district